This is a list of the songs recorded by Elvis Presley between his first demos at the Sun Studios in 1953 and his final concert on June 26, 1977, at the Market Square Arena in Indianapolis, Indiana. Total 786 songs are listed here.

Notes:
The recorded date is the first known date.
Album debut refers to each track's first appearance on LP. Many tracks had their first commercial release on singles or EP (extended play) releases, which are not noted; initial album releases occurred anywhere from a few weeks to decades after first single release. Generally, only the first RCA-licensed release is noted, as opposed to earlier release on unauthorized bootlegs.
From the late 1960s through the 1970s, several songs were recorded only in concert with no known formal studio recordings. Of the multiple live versions released on various albums (either full or partially live albums), the LP debut of the first known concert recording is indicated.
If a track was recorded both in the studio and in concert, the album debut of the studio version is indicated (even if a live version was released on LP prior to the studio version, as in the case of "Suspicious Minds", "Patch It Up", and others).
Tracks re-recorded in the studio are generally not included (e.g. "Blue Suede Shoes", "Love Letters," etc.).
Songs for which Elvis was only recorded singing a line or two (e.g. "Tiptoe Through the Tulips", "MacArthur Park", a 1968 rehearsal recording in which he sang one line of "Funny How Time Slips Away", etc.) are not included.
Rumored recordings, or recordings believed to exist but that for whatever reason have yet to be made public (such as an alleged 1955 Louisiana Hayride performance of "Rock Around the Clock" and the long-rumored Sun Records recording of "Uncle Penn") are also not included.

References

External links 

 
Presley, Elvis